The 2005 Top League Challenge Series was the 2005 edition of the Top League Challenge Series, a second-tier rugby union competition in Japan, in which teams from regionalised leagues competed for promotion to the Top League for the 2005–06 season. The competition was contested from 16 to 29 January 2005.

Fukuoka Sanix Bombs and Secom Rugguts won promotion to the 2005–06 Top League, while Honda Heat and Toyota Industries Shuttles progressed to the promotion play-offs.

Competition rules and information

The top two teams from the regional Top East League, Top West League and Top Kyūshū League qualified to the Top League Challenge Series. The regional league winners participated in Challenge 1, while the runners-up participated in Challenge 2.

The top two teams in Challenge 1 won automatic promotion to the 2005–06 Top League, while the third-placed team in Challenge 1 and the Challenge 2 winner qualified to the promotion play-offs.

Qualification

The teams qualified to the Challenge 1 and Challenge 2 series through the 2004 regional leagues.

Top West League

The final standings for the 2004 Top West League were:

 Toyota Industries Shuttles qualified for Challenge 1.
 Honda Heat qualified for Challenge 2.
 JR West Railers withdrew after the season.

Top East League

The final standings for the 2004 Top East League were:

 Secom Rugguts qualified for Challenge 1.
 Mitsubishi Sagamihara DynaBoars qualified for Challenge 2 after a play-off series involving them, Akita Northern Bullets and NTT Communications Shining Arcs.

The following matches were played:

Top Kyūshū League

The final standings for the 2004 Top Kyūshū League were:

 Coca-Cola West Red Sparks, Fukuoka Sanix Bombs and Kyuden Voltex qualified to the Second Phase.

 Fukuoka Sanix Bombs qualified for Challenge 1.
 Coca-Cola West Red Sparks qualified for Challenge 2.

Challenge 1

Standings

The final standings for the 2005 Top League Challenge 1 were:

 Fukuoka Sanix Bombs and Secom Rugguts won promotion to the 2005–06 Top League.
 Toyota Industries Shuttles progressed to the promotion play-offs.

Matches

The following matches were played in the 2005 Top League Challenge 1:

Challenge 2

Standings

The final standings for the 2005 Top League Challenge 2 were:

 Honda Heat progressed to the promotion play-offs.
 Coca-Cola West Red Sparks and Mitsubishi Sagamihara DynaBoars remain in the regional leagues.

Matches

The following matches were played in the 2005 Top League Challenge 2:

See also

 2004–05 Top League
 Top League Challenge Series

References

2005 Challenge
2004–05 in Japanese rugby union
2005 rugby union tournaments for clubs